Four Weddings is a British reality television series that premiered on Sky Living, on 6 July 2009. It has become popular enough to have inspired the creations of versions in other countries. One episode included the real-life wedding of Steps singer Faye Tozer to her second husband Michael Smith.

Format
The programme follows a similar style to Come Dine with Me, and involves four brides, or four grooms, attending each other's weddings and rating them on:

Dress (out of 10)
Venue (out of 10)
Food (out of 10)
Overall experience (out of 10)

At the end of the show, the four brides or grooms discover which of the couples has won a luxury honeymoon. Viewers could also play online in the "Online wedding rater" and rate the weddings as they were shown for comparison with the rest of the public.

Series 1 (2009)

Contestants:

Episode 1 (6 July 2009)

 Melanie from Essex
 Lorna from Cornwall
 Ada from London
 Amanda originally from Cardiff but based in Somerset- Winning Bride

Transmissions

Four Weddings

Party Wars

Ratings
Episode viewing figures from BARB.

Four Weddings, Series 1

Four Weddings, Series 2

Party Wars

Four Weddings, Series 3

Four Weddings, Series 4

International versions
The show's format has been exported to the following countries:

Note: The American version of the series features no input from the grooms, with only the brides able to give out any ratings for each ceremony.

External links

2000s British reality television series
2010s British reality television series
2009 British television series debuts
2013 British television series endings
Sky Living original programming
Television series by ITV Studios
Wedding television shows
English-language television shows